Robert Guérard (1641 – 2 January 1715) was a French Benedictine scholar of the Congregation of St. Maur.

Life
Guérard was born at Rouen. For some time he collaborated at Saint-Denys in the Maurist edition of the works of Augustine of Hippo.

His superior sent him to the monastery of Notre Dame at Ambronay, in the Diocese of Belley. While in exile, he discovered at the Carthusian monastery of Portes a manuscript of Augustine's Opus imperfectum against Julian of Eclanum, which was afterwards used in the Maurist edition of Augustine's works.

After a year of exile he was recalled, and spent the rest of his life successively at Fécamp Abbey and at the monastery of Saint-Ouen, where he died.

Works

He is the author of a biblical work entitled "L'Abrégé de la sainte Bible en forme de questions et de réponses familières", which he published at Rouen in 1707 (later edition, Paris, 1745).

References

Attribution
 The entry cites:
Tassin, Histoire literaire de la Congr. de St-Maur (Brussels, 1770), 372–4; 
BERLIERE, Nouveau Supplement a l'hist. lit. de la Congr. de St-Maur (Paris, 1908), I, 270; 
MICHAUD, Biographie universelle, s.v.

1641 births
1715 deaths
French Benedictines
French Christian monks
Fécamp Abbey